Galitsy is a rural locality (a settlement) in Kupriyanovskoye Rural Settlement, Gorokhovetsky District, Vladimir Oblast, Russia. The population was 850 as of 2010. There are 23 streets.

Geography 
Galitsy is located between Klyazma and Suvoroshch Rivers, 12 km southeast of Gorokhovets (the district's administrative centre) by road. Semyonovka is the nearest rural locality.

References 

Rural localities in Gorokhovetsky District